The Hemmkurvenhindernis was a German heavy steel barrier used during the Second World War. It was developed as a barricade against the armoured vehicles. It served as barricades on roads, bridges and beaches. It was also used in combination with other obstacles in defencelines.

History
This barricade was a one the obstacles of the Atlantic Wall, it served during the Allied invasion of Normandy.

Sources
 Obstacles on the Normandy battlefields
  TurboSquid - Hemmkurvenhindernis

Fortifications by type